Matt Barrie may refer to:

Matt Barrie (businessman), Australian technology entrepreneur
Matt Barrie (sportscaster), American ESPN sportscaster